The Konda is a river in Buryatia, southern East Siberia, Russia. There are a few inhabited places close to the banks of the river, including Tselinny, Konda, Telemba and Alekseevka in the Yeravninsky District.

The Konda is a river rich in fish. Tourists regularly visit the area for fishing and watersports. There is a military training ground of the Russian Armed Forces Eastern Military District  to the west of the left bank of the river in the area of Telemba village.

Course
The Konda is a right tributary of the Vitim. Its sources are in the small Khudan Range, west of Chita. It flows across mountainous terrain between the northern section of the Yablonoi Mountains and the Chersky Range. The river flows first in a northeastern direction and then bends gradually meandering northwards in a floodplain with about 500 lakes. The largest and most picturesque is Telemba. Finally the Konda meets the Vitim  from its mouth in the Lena.

The longest tributaries of the Konda are the Ursa, Mongoi, Ushmun and Ilkolyu on the right, and the Kumka  on the left. The river is frozen between the second half of October and early May. It can have fluctuations in the water level in summer and autumn. There is patchy distribution of permafrost in the basin.

See also
List of rivers of Russia

References

External links
р. Конда / River Konda

Rivers of Buryatia